William F. Kerby (July 28, 1908 – 1989) was chairman and CEO of Dow Jones & Co. and publisher of The Wall Street Journal from 1966 to 1975.

Kerby was responsible for building The Wall Street Journal into the second largest national newspaper in the United States with a circulation in excess of 2 million. He championed the company's diversification from a one-newspaper journal into a worldwide publishing entity.
 
Kerby born in Washington, D.C. and was a graduate of the University of Michigan.  He was awarded honorary degrees from DePauw University and Moravian College.

Kerby was selected as one of the "Great American Business Leaders" of the 20th Century by Harvard Business School.

References

1908 births
1989 deaths
University of Michigan alumni
American publishers (people)
20th-century American businesspeople